Dalibor Jevtić (born 31 March 1978) is a Kosovo Serb politician, former Deputy Mayor of Kosovo, and the former Deputy Mayor of Štrpce as well as the former Minister for Communities and Return in the Government of Kosovo. He is a vice president of the Serb List.

Biography 
Dalibor Jevtić was born on 31 March 1978 in Pristina, SFR Yugoslavia (Now Kosovo), to a Serb family, where he lived until 1980. He finished elementary and high school in Smederevo. In September 1999 he decided to return to Kosovo at a time when many Serbs were leaving this province. In April 2000 he started to work for an American company KBR, Inc. at Camp Bondsteel, near Ferizaj, simultaneously finishing college. From March 2006 to September 2009 he worked in Iraq for the same company as the manager of a military base the US Army. Several times his work got awards of the Government and the Army of the United States for outstanding contribution while working in Kosovo and in Iraq as a project manager for the support to the United States Army in peacekeeping missions in Iraq and Kosovo. He began political career at the local elections in October 2009.

Political career 
His political career started in the Independent Liberal Party (SLS), where he first participated in local elections in Štrpce, when the party participated for the first time and won significant results, going on to form local authorities in Štrpce. In October 2009 he started working as an adviser and head of the Cabinet of the Mayor of Štrpce municipality. In February 2010 he became a senior official of the SLS when he was elected party director and has since been leading  party organization in all subsequent elections. In March 2010 he took up the position of Executive Director and Director of Public Relations in Štrpce, until March 2013 when he assumed the office of Minister for Communities and Return in the Republic of Kosovo government. As the Minister dealt with the problems of returnees but especially worked on the survival of the Serb people in Kosovo and during his tenure was built more than 400 houses and realized several projects in support of the return and survival. After the election of 2014 and the end of the mandate of the Government of Kosovo is returned to the local government where in March 2015 he became deputy mayor of Štrpce, and already in April the same year, on the proposal of the Serb List returned at the head of the Ministry for Communities and Return. Previously, due to the disagreement with the policy of SLS in 2014 left the political party and together with his colleagues and political comrades in September 2015, he joined the Serbian Progressive Party.

Awards 
 Gramata Holy Synod of the Serbian Orthodox Church (September 2014)
 Manager of the year 2008 KBR
 Dozens of awards and plaques of appreciation (2000–2016)

References 

1978 births
Living people
Politicians from Pristina
Kosovo Serbs
Deputy Prime Ministers of Kosovo
Serbian Progressive Party politicians
Government ministers of Kosovo